Walwhalleya is a genus of flowering plants belonging to the family Poaceae.

It is native to the states of New South Wales, Queensland, South Australia and Victoria in Australia.

Known species
As accepted by Kew:
 Walwhalleya jacobsiana R.D.B.Whalley & J.J.Bruhl 
 Walwhalleya proluta (F.Muell.) Wills & J.J.Bruhl 
 Walwhalleya pungens (Wills & J.J.Bruhl) Wills & J.J.Bruhl 
 Walwhalleya subxerophila (Domin) Wills & J.J.Bruhl

Taxonomy
The genus name of Walwhalleya is in honour of Ralph Derwyn Broughton Whalley (b. 1933), an Australian botanist and specialist in grasses. 
It was first described and published in Austral. Syst. Bot. Vol.19 on page 327 in 2006.

References

Panicoideae
Poaceae genera
Plants described in 2006
Flora of Australia